Amanah or Al-Amanah may refer to:

Organizations
 Al Amanah College, an Islamic private school in New South Wales, Australia
 Al-Amanah Islamic Bank, a bank in the Philippines
 Amanah Raya Berhad, a Malaysian trustee company wholly owned by the Government of Malaysia
 Amanah Ikhtiar Malaysia, a Malaysian microcredit organisation
 Amanah Saham Bumiputera, a Malaysia unit trust management company
 Angkatan Amanah Merdeka (Amanah), a Malaysian Non-Government Organisation
 National Trust Party (Malaysia) or AMANAH, a political party in Malaysia

Other uses
 Amanah (administrative division), an Arabic term for mayoralty or municipality